William Bradshaw Bell, OBE, JP (9 October 1935 – 9 June 2020), was an Ulster Unionist Party (UUP) politician from Northern Ireland, and a former Lord Mayor of Belfast. Bell was a Member of the Northern Ireland Assembly (MLA) for Lagan Valley from 1998 to 2007.

He served as a Councillor on Belfast City Council from 1976 to 1985 and was Lord Mayor of Belfast from 1979 to 1980. He also served on Lisburn Council (1989–2007) and was Mayor of the City of Lisburn in 2003.

He was Personal Assistant to MP Rt Hon Sir James Molyneaux from 1976 to 1997. He was elected to the Northern Ireland Constitutional Convention (1975–1976) for North Belfast, and to the Northern Ireland Assembly for the Lagan Valley constituency in 1998 and again in 2003. In 1996 he was an unsuccessful candidate in the Northern Ireland Forum election in Lagan Valley. Bell stood in the 2007 Assembly election after re-selection by his party. However, he lost his seat to fellow UUP candidate, Basil McCrea.

He was appointed a Justice of the peace in 1985, and was a member of the Northern Ireland Housing Council.

References

External links
 NI Assembly biography, archive.org; accessed 27 February 2017.

Living people
1935 births
Officers of the Order of the British Empire
Ulster Unionist Party MLAs
Lord Mayors of Belfast
Members of the Northern Ireland Constitutional Convention
Northern Ireland MPAs 1982–1986
Northern Ireland MLAs 1998–2003
Northern Ireland MLAs 2003–2007
Members of Belfast City Council
People associated with Queen's University Belfast
Irish justices of the peace